This is a list of places in the ceremonial county of Berkshire, England.  It does not include places which were formerly in Berkshire.  For places which were formerly in Berkshire, see list of places transferred from Berkshire to Oxfordshire in 1974, and for places which were transferred from Berkshire in 1844 and 1889, see list of Berkshire boundary changes.

Local authorities 

There are six unitary authorities in Berkshire, which were formed following the dissolution of Berkshire County Council on 31 March 1998.

Towns 
There are no cities in the county with instead a relatively dense proportion of towns: Reading and Slough are the largest. Both large towns are home to universities and each has three railway stations.

 Ascot
 Bracknell
 Crowthorne
 Earley
 Eton
 Hungerford
 Maidenhead
 Newbury
 Reading
 Sandhurst
 Slough
 Thatcham
 Windsor
 Wokingham
 Woodley

Civil parishes 

The following list of civil parishes is compiled from List of civil parishes in Berkshire.  Slough and Reading (as an authority) is unparished.

Bracknell Forest 

 Binfield
 Warfield
 Winkfield

West Berkshire 

 Aldermaston
 Aldworth
 Ashampstead
 Basildon
 Beech Hill
 Beedon
 Beenham
 Boxford
 Bradfield
 Brightwalton
 Brimpton
 Bucklebury
 Burghfield
 Catmore
 Chaddleworth
 Chieveley
 Cold Ash
 Combe
 Compton
 East Garston
 East Ilsley
 Enborne
 Englefield
 Farnborough
 Fawley
 Frilsham
 Great Shefford
 Greenham
 Hampstead Norreys
 Hamstead Marshall
 Hermitage
 Holybrook
 Hungerford
 Inkpen
 Kintbury
 Lambourn
 Leckhampstead
 Midgham
 Newbury
 Padworth
 Pangbourne
 Peasemore
 Purley on Thames
 Shaw-cum-Donnington
 Speen
 Stanford Dingley
 Stratfield Mortimer
 Streatley
 Sulham
 Sulhamstead
 Thatcham
 Theale
 Tidmarsh with Sulham
 Tilehurst
 Ufton Nervet
 Wasing
 Welford
 West Ilsley
 West Woodhay
 Winterbourne
 Wokefield
 Woolhampton
 Yattendon

Windsor and Maidenhead 

 Bisham
 Bray
 Cookham
 Cox Green
 Datchet
 Horton
 Hurley
 Old Windsor
 Shottesbrooke
 Sunningdale
 Sunninghill and Ascot
 Waltham St. Lawrence
 White Waltham
 Wraysbury

Wokingham 

 Arborfield and Newland
 Barkham
 Charvil
 Earley
 Finchampstead
 Remenham
 Ruscombe
 Shinfield
 Sonning
 St. Nicholas, Hurst
 Swallowfield
 Twyford
 Wargrave
 Winnersh
 Wokingham Without
 Wokingham
 Woodley

Other settlements 
The following is a list of settlements that cannot be categorized as towns or parishes; as such the majority are suburbs, small villages, or hamlets.

Bracknell Forest 

 Billingbear
 Birch Hill
 Brock Hill
 Brookside
 Bullbrook
 Burleigh
 Chavey Down
 College Town
 Cranbourne
 Crown Wood
 Easthampstead
 Farley Wood
 Hanworth
 Harmans Water
 Hawthorn Hill
 Hayley Green
 Home Farm
 Jealott's Hill
 Lawrence Hill
 Little Sandhurst
 Maiden's Green
 Martins Heron
 Moss End
 Newell Green
 North Ascot
 Nuptown
 Owlsmoor
 Popeswood
 Priestwood
 Quelm Park
 Swinley Forest
 Temple Park
 Warfield Park
 The Warren
 Whitegrove
 Wick Hill
 Wildridings
 Winkfield Row
 Wooden Hill
 Woodside

Reading 

 Caversham
 Caversham Heights
 Caversham Park
 Coley
 Coley Park
 Emmer Green
 Katesgrove
 Southcote
 Whitley
 Whitley Wood
 Tilehurst

Slough 

 Britwell
 Chalvey
 Cippenham
 Colnbrook
 Ditton
 Haymil
 Langley
 Manor Park
 Poyle
 Upton and Upton Lea
 Wexham

West Berkshire 

 Aldermaston Wharf
 Bagnor
 Beansheaf Farm
 Beedon Common
 Benham Hill
 Bloomfield Hatch
 Brightwalton Green
 Brimpton Common
 Burghfield Bridge
 Burghfield Common
 Burghfield Hill
 Burnt Hill
 Calcot
 Chapel Row
 Colthrop
 Crockham Heath
 Crookham Common
 Crookham
 Curridge
 Denford Park
 Donnington
 Downend
 East Shefford
 Eastbury
 Eddington
 Elcot
 Eling
 Enborne Row
 Fords Farm
 Grazeley
 Grazeley Green
 Goddard's Green
 Halfway
 Heads Hill
 Hell Corner
 Hoe Benham
 Honey Bottom
 Horncastle
 Hungerford Newtown
 Hunts Green
 Hyde End
 Inkpen Common
 Lambourn Woodlands
 Leckhampstead Thicket
 Leverton
 Little Heath
 Lower Basildon
 Lower Denford
 Lower Padworth
 Marlston
 Marsh Benham
 Midgham Green
 Mortimer Common
 Mortimer
 Oare
 Ownham
 Padworth Common
 Pingewood
 Shaw
 Sheffield Bottom
 Shefford Woodlands
 Snelsmore
 South Fawley
 Southend
 Speenhamland
 Stanmore
 Stockcross
 Sulhamstead Abbots
 Tidmarsh
 Tutts Clump
 Upper Basildon
 Upper Bucklebury
 Upper Denford
 Upper Eddington
 Upper Lambourn
 Upper Woolhampton
 Wash Common
 Wash Water
 Weston
 Wickham
 Wickham Heath
 Woodlands St Mary
 Woodspeen
 World's End

Windsor and Maidenhead 

 Boyn Hill
 Braywick
 Burchetts Green
 Cheapside
 Clewer
 Cookham Dean
 Dedworth
 Eton Wick
 Fifield
 Holyport
 Knowl Hill
 Littlewick Green
 Oakley Green
 Paley Street
 Pinkneys Green
 Shurlock Row
 South Ascot
 Stubbings
 Sunninghill
 Touchen End
 Warren Row
 Water Oakley

Wokingham 

 Arborfield
 Arborfield Cross
 Arborfield Garrison
 California
 Cockpole Green
 Crazies Hill
 Emmbrook
 Farley Hill
 Gardeners Green
 Hare Hatch
 Holme Green
 Kiln Green
 Ravenswood
 Riseley
 Ryeish Green
 Sindlesham
 Spencers Wood
 Three Mile Cross
 Upper Culham
 Whistley Green
 Woosehill

See also 
List of settlements in Berkshire by population
 List of places in England

References

External links 
 Map of places in Berkshire compiled from this list

Places
 
Berkshire